Nausicaä of the Valley of the Wind may refer to

 Nausicaä of the Valley of the Wind (manga), a manga series by Hayao Miyazaki
 Nausicaä of the Valley of the Wind (film), a 1984 anime film by Hayao Miyazaki, based on the manga
 Nausicaä (Nausicaä of the Valley of the Wind), the main character of the manga series and anime film above
 The Art of Nausicaä of the Valley of the Wind, the official artbook for the manga series and anime film above

See also
 "Miss Nausicaä", a nickname for Narumi Yasuda, the singer of the film's theme song "Kaze no Tani no Naushika"
 Nausicaa (disambiguation)
 List of Nausicaä of the Valley of the Wind characters
 Giant God Warrior Appears in Tokyo